The men's 3000 metres steeplechase at the 2011 Asian Athletics Championships was held at the Kobe Universiade Memorial Stadium on the 8 of July.

Medalists

Records

Final

References

Steeplechase
Steeplechase at the Asian Athletics Championships